The 1982 UCF Knights football season was the fourth season for the team. It was first and only season for Sam Weir as the head coach of the Knights. The season marked the Knights first in Division II. Weir's 1982 team posted 0–10 overall record.

The Knights competed as an NCAA Division II Independent. The Knights played their home games at Orlando Stadium, now known as the Citrus Bowl, in Downtown Orlando. One game, the season opener against Georgia Southern, was held at a neutral field, the Gator Bowl in Jacksonville. Several of their games were played against Division I-AA opponents. one game was played against the eventual Division III national champions West Georgia.

Schedule

References

UCF
UCF Knights football seasons
College football winless seasons
UCF Knights football